Lindolf Leopold Boeckel Collor, known as Lindolfo Collor (São Leopoldo, 4 February 1890 — Rio de Janeiro, 21 September 1942) was a Brazilian journalist and politician.

He served as the first Labor minister under President Getúlio Vargas (1930-1932).

The town of Lindolfo Collor, Rio Grande do Sul is named after him.

His grandson, Fernando Collor de Mello, was President of Brazil (1990-1992).

References

External links

 site do Ministério do Trabalho e Emprego do Brasil 

1890 births
1942 deaths
People from São Leopoldo
Brazilian people of German descent
Brazilian journalists
Government ministers of Brazil
Knights Grand Cross of the Order of Isabella the Catholic
Vargas Era
20th-century journalists